The 2022 Women  Africa Cup of Nations qualification was a women's football competition which decided the participating teams of the 2022 Africa Women Cup of Nations, which in turn is part of the 2023 FIFA Women's World Cup qualification.

A total of 12 teams qualified to play in the final tournament, including the hosts (Morocco) who qualified automatically.

Format
Qualification ties were to be played on a home-and-away two-legged basis. If the aggregate score was tied after the second leg, the away goals rule would be applied, and if still tied, the penalty shoot-out (no extra time) would be used to determine the winner.

Draw
A record total of 44 (out of 54) Confederation of African Football (CAF) member national teams entered the qualifying rounds. The draw was held on 10 May 2021 at the CAF headquarters in Cairo, Egypt.
In the first round, the 44 teams were drawn into 22 ties, with teams divided into six pots based on their geographical zones and those in the same pot drawn to play against each other.
In the second round, the 22 preliminary round winners allocated into 11 ties based on the first round tie numbers.

Notes
Teams in bold qualified for the final tournament.
(W): Withdrew after draw

Did not enter

Schedule
The first round matches were originally scheduled for June 2021, but were postponed due to the COVID-19 pandemic in Africa.

First round

Summary

|}

Matches

2–2 on aggregate. Uganda won 2–1 on penalties.

Kenya won 15–1 on aggregate.

Burundi won 6–0 on aggregate.

Djibouti won on walkover after Rwanda withdrew before the first leg citing lack of preparation due to no local championship being contested since 2018.

Zambia won 4–3 on aggregate.

Namibia won 5–3 on aggregate.

Zimbabwe won 6–1 on aggregate.

Botswana won 7–1 on aggregate.

South Africa won 13–0 on aggregate.

Algeria won on walkover after the second leg match originally scheduled for 26 October 2021 was postponed and later cancelled due to the October–November 2021 Sudanese coup d'état.

Tunisia won 7–2 on aggregate.

Equatorial Guinea won on walkover and advanced to the second round after DR Congo failed to appear for the first leg.

Togo won on walkover after São Tomé and Príncipe withdrew from the second leg in Togo.

2–2 on aggregate. Gabon won on away goals.

Cameroon won 3–0 on aggregate.

Gambia won 3–1 on aggregate.

Senegal won 8–1 on aggregate.

Mali won 4–2 on aggregate.

Guinea-Bissau won 2–0 on aggregate.

Burkina Faso won 5–2 on aggregate.

Nigeria won 2–1 on aggregate.

Ivory Coast won 20–0 on aggregate.

Second round

Summary
Matches will be played between 16 and 23 February 2022. Winners will qualify for the 2022 Africa Women Cup of Nations.

|}

Matches

Uganda advanced on walkover after Kenya withdrew before the first leg.

Burundi won 11–1 on aggregate.

1–1 on aggregate. Zambia won on away goals.

3–3 on aggregate. Botswana won on away goals.

South Africa won 3–1 on aggregate.

Tunisia won 7–3 on aggregate.

Togo won 4–2 on aggregate.

Cameroon won 10–1 on aggregate.

1–1 on aggregate. Senegal won 3–2 on penalties.

Burkina Faso won 7–0 on aggregate.

Nigeria won 3–0 on aggregate.

Qualified teams
The following twelve teams qualified for the final tournament.

1 Bold indicates champions for that year. Italic indicates hosts for that year.

Goalscorers

Notes

References

2022
Women Cup of Nations
Women Cup of Nations
2021 in women's association football
2022 in women's association football
October 2021 sports events in Africa
February 2022 sports events in Africa